DeWitt High School may refer to:

 DeWitt High School (Arkansas) – De Witt, Arkansas
 DeWitt High School (Michigan) – DeWitt, Michigan
 DeWitt Clinton High School – Bronx, New York
 Jamesville-DeWitt High School – DeWitt, New York